Wang Jun (王俊, born 1953) also Wang Chun is a male former international table tennis player from China.

He won a gold medal at the 1977 World Table Tennis Championships in the Swaythling Cup (men's team event) with Kuo Yao-hua, Huang Liang, Li Chen-shih and Liang Ke-liang for China.

He was the fifth ranked player in China during 1977.

See also
 List of table tennis players
 List of World Table Tennis Championships medalists

References

Chinese male table tennis players
Living people
1953 births
Table tennis players from Shenyang
World Table Tennis Championships medalists